Besqaynar (Besqainar) is a town in Almaty Region, southeastern Kazakhstan. The town  is located between Almaty and Talgar, 25 km from Almaty and several kilometres east of Talgar.

Name
The population of the town is about 3000 people. The town possesses several tourist attractions such as Alma-Tau and Tabogan .

The town is located 1500 metres above Sea level.
Ski resort «Qaimar» was promised to be opened by the end of 2012.

References

Populated places in Almaty Region